Nikolaj Øris Nielsen (born 26 March 1986) is a Danish handballer for Bjerringbro-Silkeborg and the Danish national team.

He has previously played for league rivals club Lemvig-Thyborøn Håndbold.

Nikolaj Øris is the younger brother of follow handball players Mads Ø. Nielsen and Mikkel Ø. Nielsen. He made his debut for the Danish national team in 2010. He has played for Bjerringbro-Silkeborg all his professional career, with the exception of a year on loan at Lemvig-Thyborøn Håndbold.

Individual awards
Herreligaen top goalscorer: 2015, 2018

Honours
Danish Championship:
: 2016

References

External links

1986 births
Living people
Danish male handball players
People from Viborg Municipality
Sportspeople from the Central Denmark Region